The history of ships in North America and the maritime history of Colonial America has a strong foundation.

Description
The beginnings go back to at least as far as the first European contact with the Americas, when Leif Erikson established a short-lived settlement called Vinland in present-day Newfoundland. The existence of an actual shipping industry gradually came into being. Christopher Columbus was the first European to set foot on what would one day become U.S. territory when he came to Puerto Rico in 1493. In the 15th century, Europeans brought horses, cattle and hogs to the Americas.

Spanish explorers also reached the present-day United States. The first confirmed landing in the continental US was by a Spaniard, Juan Ponce de León, who landed in 1513 at a lush shore he christened La Florida. The Spanish sent some settlers, creating the first permanent European settlement in the continental United States at St. Augustine, Florida, in 1565 and later Santa Fe, New Mexico, San Antonio, Tucson, San Diego, Los Angeles and San Francisco. Most Spanish settlements were along the California coast or the Santa Fe River in New Mexico.

The first successful English colony was established in 1607, on the James River at Jamestown. It languished for decades until a new wave of settlers arrived in the late 17th century and set up commercial agriculture based on tobacco.

The connection between the American colonies and Europe, with shipping as its cornerstone, would continue to grow unhindered for almost two hundred years.

Notes

See also 

Awards and decorations of the United States Merchant Marine
History of navigation
Honourable Company of Master Mariners London
Jones Act
Liberty ship
United States Merchant Marine
Navy Reserve Merchant Marine Badge
United States Maritime Service
United States Merchant Marine Academy
Slave ship and History of slavery in the United States

References
.

External links

Sea History at the National Maritime Historical Society
American Merchant Marine at War
United States Merchant Marine in history
Casualty statistics World War II
Recipients of Merchant Marine Distinguished Service Medal
Seafarers International Union - War's Forgotten Heroes (Article)
Heave Ho — The United States Merchant Marine Anthem (lyrics only)
Fairplay The International Shipping Weekly
The Nautical Institute
A Maritime Tracking System: Cornerstone of Maritime Homeland Defense

Legislation
HR23 Bill Merchant Marine veteran benefits 
Merchant Seamen's War Service Acts of 1945 and 1947 including 1945 and 1947 Bill of Rights

Maritime history of the United States
Colonization history of the United States